Unification Theological Seminary (UTS) is a private Unification Church-affiliated graduate seminary headquartered in Midtown Manhattan, New York City, New York. The seminary was granted an absolute charter from the State of New York in January 1984 and received accreditation from the Middle States Commission on Higher Education in November 1996.

UTS also has a larger, 250-acre campus located in Dutchess County, New York; however, almost all instruction is now conducted through the seminary’s New York headquarters. The seminary's first classes were offered in September 1975.

Students and alumni 
While the majority of UTS students have been Unification Church members, there are also students from other faiths. Historically, the UTS faculty has included academics representing the Jewish, Islamic, and Christian faiths, as well as Unificationist faculty with degrees from Harvard University, Columbia University, Graduate Theological Union, The New School, Vanderbilt University, and Drew University. The Seminary has over 125 students enrolled in its three Master degrees and in its Doctorate of Ministry (D.Min.) program. Most Unification Church leaders in the United States hold UTS degrees. UTS graduates have also played major leadership roles in many of the Unification Church-related organizations in the United States, as well as Unification-inspired civil society and corporate entities including the Universal Peace Federation, the Family Federation for World Peace, World Collegiate Association for the Research of Principles (CARP), the American Clergy Leadership Conference, World & I Magazine, Paragon Publishers, the Professors World Peace Academy, Unification Theological Seminary, and the Women’s Federation for World Peace. As of 2022, there are over 1,550 UTS graduates.

Research and publication 
Since its inception, the Unification Theological Seminary has served as the principal venue to provide formal, academic religious and theological training for its Church leaders. It has offered courses in New Testament, Old Testament, the Pauline Epistles, Patristics, Hermeneutics, Church History, Apologetics as well as Islam, East Asian Religion, Religious Education, Peace Studies, as well as in the Unification Church’s own canon of Divine Principle, Unification Thought, the Teachings and Writings of Reverend Sun Myung Moon and Dr. Hak Ja Han Moon and their applications, and other related sources.

The Seminary has played an important role in Unification apologetics, academic research related to the movement’s historical development, and in the articulation of the Unificationist perspective. Dr. Young Oon Kim, the Unification Church’s first theologian and the first Korean missionary to the United States, taught at Unification Theological Seminary from its founding in 1975 until just prior to her death in 1989. Dr. Kim authored several seminal church academic texts including Unification Principle and its Applications (1980) and Unification Theology (1980), Unification Thought and Christian Theology (date), and Systematic Theology. Dr. David S.C. Kim, an early missionary, who served as President of the Unification Theological Seminary from 1975-1994 edited the authoritative three-volume Day of Hope in Review texts, comprehensive collections of the press coverage of the early years of Reverend Moon’s speaking tours in the United States. Dr. Andrew Wilson, a Harvard-trained Old Testament Scholar, oversaw the selection of texts and the editing of World Scriptures (1991) and also served as co-author together with Dr. Joong Hyun Pak of True Family Values. Dr. Wilson is currently working with Rev. Hee Hun Standard in the translation, editing, preparation for publication of 원리 원본 (Wolli Wonbon), the original draft of Unification teachings personally drafted by Reverend Sun Myung Moon. Dr. Michael Mickler’s History of the Unification Church in America (1993) and his 40 Years in America: An Intimate History of the Unification Movement 1959-1999 (2000) are authoritative texts on the Unification Movement, documenting both its achievements and challenges. Over the past five decades, numerous volumes on Theology, Church History, Religious Education, Inter-Religious Dialogue, Peace Studies, Evolution, Threats to Ecosystems, and on the Philosophy of Science have been published by UTS faculty and alums, including Dr. Jonathan Wells, Dr. Thomas Walsh, Dr. Karen Smith, Dr. Keisuke Noda, Dr. Frank Kaufmann, Dr. Frederick Swarts, and Dr. Kathy Winings, who currently serves as National President of the Religious Education Association. The Seminary also sponsors The Journal of Unification Studies, an academic journal.

Academics
The seminary offers four distinct degree programs:

Presidents

Notable alumni
Daniel Fefferman, executive director of the International Coalition for Religious Freedom.
Michael Jenkins, president of U.S. Unification Church (2000–2009)
Thomas Walsh, Chairman of Universal Peace Federation, International (2005–present)
Lee Shapiro, documentarian killed while filming in Afghanistan during the Soviet–Afghan War.
Jonathan Wells (1978), biologist, author and proponent of Intelligent design.
Andrew Wilson, academic dean of UTS; editor of World Scripture: A Comparative Anthology of Sacred Texts
Mike Yakawich, member of the Montana House of Representatives

See also
Unification Church of the United States
Union Theological Seminary, associated with Columbia University, which shares the acronym "UTS".

References

External links
 Official website

Unification Church affiliated organizations
Unification Church and mainstream Christianity
Unification Church and Judaism
Seminaries and theological colleges in New York City
Red Hook, New York
Unification Theological Seminary graduates
Educational institutions established in 1975
Universities and colleges in Dutchess County, New York